Julia Kapatelis and her daughter Vanessa "Nessie" Kapatelis are fictional characters created by writer/artist George Pérez for the Wonder Woman ongoing series published by DC Comics. Debuting in 1987, the Kapatelises would serve as recurring supporting characters for Wonder Woman until the 2000s.

Fictional character biography

Childhood
Julia was born in Cefalonia, Greece to Greek Orthodox parents Agostos and Maria Deneiros in the 1930s. In June 1937, while still a toddler, Julia went sailing with her parents on the Ionian Sea but fell overboard due to a sudden storm. She was rescued from drowning by the goddess Thetis. Thetis would rescue mortal female children she deemed "special" and safely transport them to the shores of Themyscira's Island of Healing (male children were taken someplace else). Once on the island the Amazon's chief physician Epione would discover them and tend to their care. After this the child would be taken to the royal palace where one Amazon is selected as the child's "Guardian of Inspiration". The silver haired Amazon Pythia volunteered to bless baby Julia, granting her great wisdom and strength of spirit. According to Pythia, Julia was the last of hundreds of babies to experience this. This "blessing" in actuality was a subliminal suggestion for the child to teach peace and equality throughout their lives. This blessing can extend to descendants as well. This custom is called "Send Forth". Once this is done the child is considered an Amazon and spiritual daughter to the Amazon who blessed them. After a few days of recuperation and blessings the child is taken to the island shores again where she is taken back into the ocean and returned, again by Thetis who magically travels back in time to return the child to the exact point in time when the child first left her homeland. Because of this, Julia's parents believed baby Julia had disappeared under the stormy waters for only a few seconds before being pulled back into the boat.

Family

As with countless other female babies blessed by the Amazons before her, Julia thrived in her newfound spiritual blessing, excelling at every task she undertook. Despite her accomplishments Julia lost her brother, Peter Deneiros, during the war in 1944 as part of the Greek Underground when she was still very young.

Later, Julia met David Kapatelis while attending Athens University. Julia was studying for her geology major while David was studying for his archaeology major, which Julia took on as her minor study subject herself. They traveled the world together exploring various cultures and histories. At each site they would visit Julia would write down her findings and have them published in various academic journals. Eventually Julia married David in Greece. An independent thinker, Julia wanted to keep her maiden name as her family had no one else to carry it on. This upset David's traditional Greek family so she relented and took David's family name of Kapatelis.

Julia became pregnant while she and David were exploring Scotland. As a joke David wanted to name their unborn child "Nessie" after the local Scottish creature the Loch Ness Monster. Though humored, Julia did not agree but settled on Vanessa as a close substitute. Julia remained married to David until his death 22 years into their marriage when Vanessa was five years old. He died while exploring ruins in Egypt. Deciding to make a fresh start Julia took Vanessa to live in the U.S. where she eventually became the Dean for the Department of History and Geology at Harvard University. They currently live in the Beacon Hill section of Boston, Massachusetts.

While at Harvard Julia worked alongside a promising student named Helena Sandsmark. Julia mentored Helena over the years and eventually helped Helena become a professor and curator at the Gateway City Museum of Cultural Antiquities. Helena would later have a daughter named Cassandra Sandsmark.

Diana
During her time at Harvard Julia also met Wonder Woman. Julia was the first non-Amazon woman Diana aka Wonder Woman ever met. At that time Diana was unfamiliar with the English language and only spoke her native Themyscirian. As it was a close derivative of Greek, Julia was able to understand Diana to an extent. Julia took Diana into her home and family and taught her not only English but modern history as well.

After Vanessa was attacked by Decay, Julia made Diana's fight her own and helped her battle the war god Ares.

Still unaware of her own Amazonian ties, Julia eventually touched Harmonia's talisman during her first meeting with Diana, which resulted with several flashes of memories from Julia's Send Forth period. This confused Julia until she later was invited to Diana's homeland of Themyscira. On her visit she met Pythia and the two felt a strange connection to each other. When Julia and Pythia touched hands, Julia's previous history on Themyscira ran through both Julia's and Pythia's mind, unlocking her forgotten past. Reunited, Julia and Pythia formed a close bond. Similar to Julia's mother-like role to Diana, Pythia developed a protective relationship to Julia. When the witch Circe kidnapped Julia during the War of the Gods storyline, Pythia took it upon herself to rescue Julia, calling Julia her daughter.

When Diana became ambassador of Themyscira, Julia knew Diana would need help adjusting to a world of men and became a sort of foster mother to Diana. During these events Julia managed to keep her personal and academic life pretty full. On trips to Greece Julia reconnected with Stavros Christadoulodou, a noted epigraphist and a close family friend for many years. Though both interested, their relationship remained only as close and respected friends. A similar situation occurred between Julia and one of Vanessa's high school geometry teachers named Horace Westlake. The two dated for a few months until he was killed by Doctor Psycho. At one point Julia was presented with a grant by the National Geographic Society to locate the original city of Themyscira in the country of Turkey, but Julia canceled the excavation midway through the project because one of Vanessa's friends committed suicide.

Julia's and Diana's friendship endured over many trials, mostly due to Diana's enemies attacking Julia's daughter. It was not until Vanessa was brainwashed and transformed into the villainous Silver Swan though that Julia's and Diana's friendship was temporarily put on hold. Julia resented Diana for not protecting Vanessa from Diana's enemies. After some time Julia came to a resolution with Diana. She agreed to have Diana help in her daughter's rehabilitation. They have since fully reconciled and Julia was last seen at Vanessa's college graduation along with Diana.

Julia of Daxam
A blind female warrior from the planet Daxam befriended Wonder Woman during a six-issue story arc set in space. Both women were prisoners of the Sangtee Empire. Sangtee enforcers ripped out her eyes when she proved to be too difficult to control. Wonder Woman provided her with one cybernetic eye (the other covered with an eye patch) and named the Daxamite Julia in honor of her close friend Julia Kapatelis. Julia later makes a cameo appearance during the company-wide "Our Worlds at War" crossover.

Alternative versions
An alternate reality version of Julia is seen in Trinity. In a distorted reality where Wonder Woman appears to have been erased from existence, Julia meets a pregnant woman named Desiree, who has been drawing sketches of and related to Wonder Woman. Julia compliments her drawing talent and gives her a business card, stating she is the "Director of Restoration" for the Smithsonian National Museum of Natural History. Julia tells the woman she has a daughter, who is in college now. It seems Julia has the blessing from being "Sent Forth", leading to her survival and successful career, but never met Diana; therefore her daughter was never brainwashed into becoming the Silver Swan.

In other media

Film 
 Julia and Vanessa Kapatelis appear in the animated film Wonder Woman: Bloodlines, voiced by Nia Vardalos and Marie Avgeropoulos, respectively. In this version, Diana Prince / Wonder Woman stays with the Kapatelis family following her departure from Themyscira. As Vanessa ages, she becomes jealous of Diana, feeling that her mother Julia favors Diana over her. Vanessa adopts the Silver Swan persona and becomes an adversary to Wonder Woman.

Television 
 Julia Kapatelis made another appearance in DC Super Hero Girls, voiced by Kari Wahlgren, in the episode "#HousePest". Depicted as an archaeology professor who has had a long-standing fascination with Amazon culture, she runs into Diana by chance during the latter's search for a proper home. Feeling lonely due to Vanessa being away at college, Julia lets Diana move in and gives her a spare bedroom, which she fills with artifacts that remind her of Themiscyra.

Footnotes

Characters created by George Pérez
Comic strip duos
Comics characters introduced in 1987
DC Comics Amazons
DC Comics female characters
Fictional archaeologists
Fictional Harvard University people
Fictional characters from Boston
Fictional Greek people
Fictional professors
Fictional schoolteachers
People from Cephalonia